Radoslav Bachev (born 9 April 1981) is a Bulgarian former professional footballer who played as a defender.

Career
Bachev started his professional career as a footballer at Septemvri Simitli. After that, he played for Pirin Blagoevgrad and Marek Dupnitsa, before signing with Cherno More in early 2006 as a free agent.

Cherno More
In July 2007 Bachev scored his first goal for Cherno More against FK Makedonija Gjorče Petrov in the UEFA Intertoto Cup at the Skopje City Stadium. The goal was scored in the 48th minute. The result of the match ended with a 4:0 away win for Cherno More. A year later, in July 2008, Bachev scored his second goal for the club in the first qualifying round of the UEFA Cup against UE Sant Julià. The result of the match was another 4:0 win for Cherno More.

Achievements
Bulgarian Cup finalist with Cherno More Varna: 2008

References

Bulgarian footballers
1981 births
Living people
Association football defenders
First Professional Football League (Bulgaria) players
OFC Pirin Blagoevgrad players
PFC Marek Dupnitsa players
PFC Cherno More Varna players
FC Montana players
Botev Plovdiv players
PFC Akademik Svishtov players
FC Septemvri Simitli players